The 1997 North American Touring Car Championship was the second and final season of the North American Touring Car Championship.  The series was organized by CART, and ran to Super Touring regulations.  18 rounds at 9 race meetings were organized, all but one (in Savannah, Georgia) supporting the CART World Series.

Teams and drivers

Calendar
The initial calendar was released with sixteen races, all supporting CART events. A doubleheader at the Savannah, Georgia Indy Lights' Dixie Crystals Grand Prix was added later.

Championship standings

Drivers Championship

Manufacturers Championship

See also
1997 CART season
1997 Indy Lights season
1997 Formula Atlantic season

References

External links
Results & points
http://www.driverdb.com/standings/639-1997/

North American Touring Car Championship
Seasons in touring car racing
North American Touring Car Championship
North American Touring Car Championship